"One Vision" is a song written and recorded by the British rock band Queen, first released as a single in November 1985 and then included on their 1986 album A Kind of Magic. It was conceived by the group's drummer Roger Taylor.

The song was inspired by the life and exploits of Martin Luther King Jr., with the lyrics recounting a man battling and overcoming the odds. In the 2011 BBC documentary, Queen: Days of Our Lives, Taylor stated his lyrics were "sort of half nicked off Martin Luther King's famous speech". The song's music video featured a "morphing" effect of the band's famous pose in 1975's "Bohemian Rhapsody" video to a 1985 version of the same pose. The song was included in all Queen's live concert performances of The Magic Tour, as the first song of each concert. They claimed they chose "One Vision" as the introduction song because its intro made a perfect concert introduction.

Background and production

Production
"One Vision" was, for the most part, a group effort with no-one taking sole credit. This, however, made it more complicated to put the song together as nobody had the final say. A week was spent coming up with various ideas in the studio with four or five songs-worth of material to choose from, out of which came "One Vision".

The song's introduction was done with a Kurzweil K250 synthesizer. Mack acknowledged that lead singer Freddie Mercury wanted "lots of strange noises and swirling sounds", so he came into the studio one morning, sampled some of the vocal lines Mercury sang into the Kurzweil and toyed around with them by creating a downward pitch change and applying various effects to it. The ending was done in a similar fashion, with Mack playing the word sample "vision" repeatedly to create the jet-like sound that finishes the track. In fact, most of the keyboard parts in the song are K250 factory patches: for example, the main string sound is the "Fast String" preset.

To create the song's guitar sound, Brian May used his custom Pete Cornish distortion box to process his guitar signal before it was run through a pair of Vox AC30 amps with a simple MXR delay between them (slowly alternating between 7 milliseconds and 12 milliseconds) - using his Red Special guitar, as in most other Queen tracks. Moreover, the three-part guitar harmony heard in the last chorus was done with two AC30s. The lead guitar break was recorded later on at Maison Rouge Studios in London, using a single Galien Kruger amp - in the mix, Mack would add a little reverb to the lead part while the rhythm parts were left completely dry.

The backing vocals consisted of three-part harmonies with an occasional fourth part, with each part sung and recorded three times by May, Taylor and Mercury. This, according to Mack, gave the song "a very full, final sound". All vocals, including Mercury's lead vocal part, were recorded with AKG C414 microphones.

The rhythmical section in the middle of the song was Taylor's Simmons kit triggered by a LinnDrum drum machine, along with some real drums played on top - to thicken the snare sound and make it "more cutting", a Simmons snare was sampled into an AMS delay and triggered along with the real snare. In that section there was some "live" Roland Jupiter-8 and a few guitar fills.

In terms of recording, three multitrack tapes were used throughout (as the process was rather vague), with two used for mixdown - a Studer A80 and A800. The song was mixed onto a Mitsubishi X80 digital stereo, a Sony PCM-F1 and a Studer A810. Reverbs used during mixdown include an EMT 252 (on the non-linear programme), an EMT 140 (on the bass drum), a Quantec room simulator and a Lexicon 224 (gated reverb).

Distorted vocals, intro and coda

The opening of "One Vision" contains altered (pitch-shifted) vocal sounds (which on the album and extended versions, also appear throughout Roger Taylor's drum section and in the end), most prominently the vocals retained in the single version.

The most prominent vocals of this type relay alternate lyrics when played forwards—they say, "God works in mysterious ways... mysterious ways...". It is clearly shown during the portions of the studio recording session of "One Vision" on both the Magic Years documentary and the DVD Greatest Video Hits II that Freddie Mercury sings the line.

There are various other altered vocal sounds as well but what exactly they say is not yet known. Even more pitch-shifted vocals appear in "Blurred Vision". Finally, a version of the beginning pitch-shifted vocal sounds followed by other altered vocals without any music playing over them, appears in the soundtrack of The eYe video game, as Track 05 on CD 2 (The Works Domain).

Also, the live versions of the song included a different version of the intro, which starts like the single version intro, but later changes into the album version intro, but repeats the section after the vocals "Ii" near the end.

The VHS version of the 12 July Wembley show has the first part of the middle instrumental section of the studio version of "Brighton Rock" instead of the initial pitch-shifted vocals. The version of the song from the 11 July Wembley show is now included on the Queen Live at Wembley Stadium 25th Anniversary Edition DVD and the A Kind of Magic 2011 Deluxe CD. This version of the intro has never been used with a studio version of the song so far.

The progressive synthesiser music from the last part of the intro is repeated in the "I had a dream" section, complete with the last elongated note.

The ending or outro varies from version to version. In the single version, it's a simple "Vision vision vision..." echo, while the album version adds to it some synthesiser music, a random bit of altered vocal sounds and the prominent beginning pitch-shifted vocals. "Blurred Vision" adds an even longer version of the elongated note ending the normal song's intro, and a random pitch-shifted vocal.

The ending in the 1986 live versions is a flourish which varies from performance to performance - usually consisting of a brief snippet from "Star Fleet" - but still maintaining the same basic pattern, although parts of it to the synthesizer music from the album version's ending.

"Fried chicken"
The final line of the song (in the studio, live, and "Blurred Vision" versions, in the album and extended versions the line before the final "God works in mysterious ways... Mysterious ways...") is "fried chicken", although the lyrics say "one vision". This was the result of trying to come up with the proper wording of the song, and since it was not working, Freddie Mercury at some point introduced words that had nothing to do with the song for fun, as suggested by his partner, Jim Hutton. Some other made-up words during rehearsals were "one shrimp, one prawn, one clam, one chicken" and some profanity.

Single B-side
An extensively remixed version of the song, titled "Blurred Vision" appears as the B-side of both the 7" and 12" single releases. It is exactly the same version on both formats. This is primarily an extended and completely different (but not in structure) version of Taylor's drum section from the A-side. However, it retains the original ending, albeit with a longer version of the music from the end of the original's intro plus an additional non-altered sound over the final vocals "Vision vision vision vision..." (which are like those in the single version). It also repeats the existing famous pitch-shifted vocals, and adds new, less-prominent pitch-shifted vocals.

Chart performance
"One Vision" became another hit single for Queen in many countries, reaching the top 40 in the Netherlands (number 21), Switzerland (number 24), and West Germany (number 26). It also had minor chart success on the US Billboard Hot 100, where it peaked at number 61, and on the Canadian RPM 100 Singles chart, peaking at number 76. It became a big hit in the band's native United Kingdom, climbing to number seven on the UK Singles Chart, and in Ireland, where it reached number five. It also peaked at number 10 on Australia's Kent Music Report.

Music video
The music video to "One Vision" which was recorded in September 1985 mainly showed the band recording the song at Musicland Studios in Munich and was the first to be directed and produced for Queen by Austrian directors Rudi Dolezal and Hannes Rossacher, also collectively known as DoRo. DoRo and Queen developed a fruitful working relationship which would result in numerous acclaimed and award-winning videos (for "Innuendo" and "The Show Must Go On", among others).

The video also featured a "morphing" effect of the band's famous pose in 1974's Queen II album cover and 1975's "Bohemian Rhapsody" video to a 1985 version of the same pose. The video even shows John Deacon on the drums. There was also a video made to match the 12" inch version of the song which appears on Queen Rocks The Video VHS and Queen: Greatest Video Hits 2 DVD.

An alternate version of the music video was produced splicing in scenes from the 1986 film, Iron Eagle , with the standard video footage. The song was used multiple times during the training and battle scenes of the film, where the young hero, Doug Masters, plays the track on his cassette player and headphones. This version can still be found on the Internet. "One Vision" also appeared on the Iron Eagle (soundtrack) released in 1986.

Track listings 
7" Single

A Side. "One Vision" (Single Version) - 4:02

B Side. "Blurred Vision" - 4:41

12" Single

A Side. "One Vision" (Extended Version) - 6:28

B Side. "Blurred Vision" - 4:41

Personnel
Freddie Mercury – lead and backing vocals, sampler
Brian May – electric guitar, synthesizer, sampler, backing vocals
Roger Taylor – drums, electronic drums, backing vocals
John Deacon – bass guitar

Charts

Certifications

References

External links
Official YouTube videos: music video, music video (extended), music video (VEVO)
Lyrics at Queen official website

Queen (band) songs
1985 singles
Songs written by Freddie Mercury
Songs written by Roger Taylor (Queen drummer)
Songs written by John Deacon
Songs written by Brian May
Song recordings produced by Reinhold Mack
EMI Records singles
Capitol Records singles
Hollywood Records singles
British hard rock songs
1985 songs